Ilan Chet  (Hebrew: אילן חת) (born April 12, 1939) is an Israeli microbiologist and a professor at the Hebrew University of Jerusalem, Faculty of Agriculture in Rehovot. He was appointed Deputy Secretary General of the Union of the Mediterranean in 2010 with responsibility for its Higher Education and Research Division In 2000 he was nominated for the position of President of the Weizmann Institute of Science.

Early life
Chet was born in Haifa, Israel. He completed his BSc (1962), MSc (1964) and PhD from the Hebrew University of Jerusalem, Faculty of Agriculture. He completed his PhD in Microbiology.

Research
Chet is recognized as a pioneer in the field of biological control of plant pathogens which cause major crop losses. His research concerns with the biological control of plant disease using environment-friendly microorganisms, focusing on the basic, applied, and biotechnological aspects of this field. Chet has published over 300 articles in international scientific journals, edited three books in his field, and holds 30 patents.

Awards and honors
Chet has received several awards and honors for his work.
 In 1990, he was awarded the Rothschild Prize in Agriculture.
 In 1991, he was awarded an honorary doctorate from Sweden's Lund University
 In 1994, he received the Max-Planck Award for Distinguished Research.
 In 1996, he received the Japanese Arima Prize for Applied Microbiology.
 In 1996, he was awarded the Israel Prize in agriculture.
 In 1998, he received the Wolf Prize in Agriculture.
 In 2011, received the Solomon Bublick Award of the Hebrew University of Jerusalem.

He has been a member of the Israel Academy of Sciences and Humanities since 1998, and in 2000 was nominated for the position of President of the Weizmann Institute of Science.

See also
List of Israel Prize recipients

References

1939 births
Academic staff of the Hebrew University of Jerusalem
Living people
Israeli Jews
Israel Prize in agriculture recipients
Presidents of Weizmann Institute of Science
Members of the Israel Academy of Sciences and Humanities
Israeli microbiologists
Hebrew University of Jerusalem alumni
EMET Prize recipients in the Life Sciences
Wolf Prize in Agriculture laureates
Solomon Bublick Award recipients
Presidents of universities in Israel